Tomás Barrios Vera was the defending champion but chose not to defend his title.

Bernabé Zapata Miralles won the title after defeating Dennis Novak 6–1, 6–2 in the final.

Seeds

Draw

Finals

Top half

Bottom half

References

External links
Main draw
Qualifying draw

Meerbusch Challenger - 1
2022 Singles